Stryi is a city located on the left bank of the river Stryi in Lviv Oblast (region) of western Ukraine 65 km to the south of Lviv (in the foothills of the Carpathian Mountains). It serves as the administrative center of Stryi Raion (district). Stryi hosts the administration of Stryi urban hromada, one of the hromadas of Ukraine.

Stryi is considered to be the first city in Ukraine to bear the blue-over-yellow Ukrainian national flag when it was hoisted on the flagpole of the Town Hall on March 14, 1990, even before the fall of the Soviet Union in December 1991.

Population

Name

The city takes its name from the name of the river Stryi, one of the tributaries of the Dniester.

Stryi, as a name of river is a very old name and means "stream". Its etymology stems from an Indo-European root *sreu. Words that have the same root can be found in modern Ukrainian - струм, струя, Polish - struga, strumień, Irish (Celtic) - sruami, German - Strom (large river), Persian - struth (river), Sanskrit -  sravati (to flow), Latvian - straume, Lithuanian - sriatas, strautas (stream, the thing that flows) and several other languages. The word has a possible relation to the word "Styr", which means "big" in Ossetian, as there is also other Styr River in Ukraine. The area was inhabited by the White Croats and it has been established that name Horvat (Croat) is likewise of Iranian (Sarmatian) origin.

In different times the name was written differently, and in various old documents we can find such names: Stryg, Stry, Stryj, Stryjn, Stryjia, Strig, Strigenses, Stryi, Strey, Striig, Strya, Sthryensis, Sthrya, Stryei, and Stri. The inhabitants take pride in the fact that the city has managed to keep its original name over time.

History

Stryi was mentioned for the first time in 1385 (see: Red Ruthenia). Already then its territory was incorporated in the Kingdom of Poland after the decline of Ruthenian Kingdom. In 1387 the Polish king Jogaila gave the city as the present to his pro-Tsarist brother Švitrigaila. In 1431 it was given the Magdeburg Rights, and it was located in the Ruthenian Voivodeship, which from the 14th century until 1772 was a part of Poland. The city was governed by the local magistrate headed by a burgomaster.

Its geographical location had a positive influence on its development and growth. The city became a flourishing trade center being located on the major trade route between Halych and Lviv and especially during the 15th to 16th century due to support from the Polish king John III Sobieski. It also was destroyed during one of the Tatars raids in 1523. The city was later rebuilt and included a castle for defense purposes which later in the 18th century was demounted by the Austrian authorities. In 1634 the city was destroyed once again by another Tatar raid. In times of the Khmelnytsky Uprising the Cossack Hetmanate army was reinforced here by the Hungarian regiments of prince Rákóczi of Transylvania. After the partition of the Polish–Lithuanian Commonwealth in 1772 the city became a part of the Austro-Hungarian Empire (see: Partitions of Poland). During the revolutionary times in the empire the Ruthenian Council was created in the city in 1848. During 1872-1875 the city was connected to a railroad network. Its first wooden train station was built in 1875. At this time it started to industrialize. Among the most influencing citizens of the city were Doctor Yevhen Olesnytsky, Father Oleksa Bobykevych, and Father O.Nyzhankivsky.

In 1886, a large fire burned almost the entire city to the ground. From October 1914 to May 1915 Stryi was occupied by the Russian Empire. In 1915 a bloody World War I battle took place in the Carpathian Mountains, around the peak of Zwinin (992 metres above sea level), a few kilometres south of Stryi in which some 33,000 Russian soldiers perished.

On November 1, 1918, an armed uprising took place in the city, after which it became a part of the West Ukrainian People's Republic. Stryi was passed to Poland in May 1919, and became part of Poland first by the Warsaw treaty of 1920 and then the Riga Peace treaty of 1921. In 1939, following the Soviet Union's invasion of eastern Poland, Stryi became part of the Ukrainian SSR. (see: Polish September Campaign). In interbellum Poland, it was the capital of the Stryj County (area , pop. 152,600) of the Stanisławów Voivodeship. According to the Polish census of 1931, its population consisted of 35.6% Jews, 34.5% Poles, 28% Ukrainians and 1.6% Germans.

In July 1941 the Nazis conquered Stryi. In a short time, Ukrainians and local Poles conducted a pogrom in the Jews of the settlement, killing about 300 people. Between then and August, 1943, the Nazis, with the assistance of the Ukrainian police, murdered most of the town's 11,000 Jews in a nearby forest or rounded them up to be sent to  Belzec extermination camp. Of a prewar population of 11,000, only a few Jews survived.

During the Cold War the town was home to Stryy air base.

Recent history
On April 9, 2009, the Lviv Oblast council decided to remove a Soviet-era statue to the Red Army soldier that was installed by the local Communist regime in the city of Stryi and move it to a museum of the Soviet totalitarianism, saying that the statue carries no historical or cultural value to the city.

Until 18 July 2020, Stryi was incorporated as a city of oblast significance and served as the administrative center of Stryi Raion even though it did not belong to the raion. In July 2020, as part of the administrative reform of Ukraine, which reduced the number of raions of Lviv Oblast to seven, the city of Stryi was merged into Stryi Raion.

Notable people
Notable people born in Stryi include the following:

 Anna Muzychuk (born 1990), Ukrainian chess player
 Mariya Muzychuk (born 1992), Ukrainian chess player
 Sviatoslav Shevchuk (born 1970), Major Archbishop of the Ukrainian Greek Catholic Church
 Vitaliy Antonov  (born 1962), Ukrainian businessman
 Louis Begley (born 1933), Polish-American novelist
 Solomon J. Buchsbaum (1929–1993), Polish-American physicist
 Włodzimierz Godłowski (1900–1940), Polish neurologist
 Benedykt Halicz (1903–1997), Polish biologist 
 Artem Hromov (born 1990), Ukrainian footballer
 Antoni (Illiashewicz) (born n.1700-1775), orth. bishop of Vjatka and Velikoperm, Russia 
 Julia Keilowa (1902–1943), Polish designer
 Michael Kmit (1910–1981), Australian painter
 Jan Kociniak (1937–2007), Polish actor
 Józef Koffler (1896–1941), Polish composer
 Józef Kustroń (1892–1939), general of the Polish Army
 Kornel Makuszyński (1884–1953), Polish writer
 Zbigniew Messner (1929–2014), Prime Minister of Poland 1985–88
 Kazimierz Nowak (1897–1937), Polish traveller
 Taras Petrivskyi (born 1984), Ukrainian footballer
 Pola Stout (1902–1984), American interior and textile designer
 Julian Stryjkowski (1905–1996), Polish writer
 Zygmunt Szendzielarz (1910–1951), commandant of the Home Army
 Ihor Tenyukh (born 1958), Ukrainian admiral
 Andriy Tlumak (born 1979), Ukrainian footballer
 Kazimierz Wierzyński (1894–1969), Polish writer, poet
 Zygmunt Wojciechowski (1900–1955), Polish historian

Twin towns – sister cities

Stryi is twinned with:

 Bălți, Moldova (1980)
 Düren, Germany (2001)
 Gradačac, Bosnia and Herzegovina
 Lwówek Śląski County, Poland (2005)
 Mansfield, England, United Kingdom
 Nowy Sącz, Poland
 Vegreville, Canada (2009)
 Zakopane, Poland (2004)

Other forms of cooperation

 Daugavpils, Latvia
 Kiskunhalas, Hungary
 Les Herbiers, France
 Leszno, Poland

References
Notes

External links

Stryi City Council official web-site
Stryi Unofficial web-site
ShtetLinks page - Stryy
 Stryj (Stryi) in the Geographical Dictionary of the Kingdom of Poland (1890)

 
Cities in Lviv Oblast
Kingdom of Galicia and Lodomeria
Stanisławów Voivodeship
Ruthenian Voivodeship
Shtetls
Cities of regional significance in Ukraine
Holocaust locations in Ukraine